Work on translation of the Bible into the Kazakh language began with the work of Charles Fraser of the Scottish Missionary Society. Fraser's translation of Matthew was published in 1818 (this was based on H. Brunton's Karass translation, and modified for Kazakh), and the New Testament in 1820 by the Russian Bible Society. J. M. E. Gottwald, a professor at Kazan University, revised it, and this was published in 1880 by the British and Foreign Bible Society in Kazan, and it was republished in 1887, and 1910. George W. Hunter, of the China Inland Mission in Ürümqi, considered this translation to be "a good translation, into Astrahan-Turki", he does not seem to have considered it to be Kazakh. Darlow and Moule say that it was intended for Kyrgyz in the neighbourhood of Orenburg, and the language was sometimes called "Orenburg Tatar". According to Rev. W. Nicholson of the Royal Asiatic Society in St Petersburg this translation was intended for "The Kirghese hordes—Great, Little, and Middle, as they are called—[who] occupy various regions in Southern Siberia, Central Asia, and west of the Caspian Sea." George A. King says Fraser's translation was into the language of the "Western Kirghiz or Kirghiz-Kazak, though they disown the name Kirghiz".

Macarius II, the Bishop of Tomsk, translated Mark, published by the British and Foreign Bible Society in Tomsk in 1894. All four Gospels in one volume were published in Kazan by Pravoslavnoe Missionerskoe Obshchestvo in 1901. This may be related to the edition of Mark previously published in Kazan, or could be the same as I. Katerinski's translation, listed in Book of a Thousand Tongues as Kirghiz.

Mildred Cable's biography of George Hunter just says "a Qazaq speaking Russian". This version is printed in a Cyrillic script, slightly different from what Qazaqs use today; this script has a lot of Russian/Greek words in it, and uses Russian/Greek names, instead of Qazaq/Islamic ones. The 1901 work was republished in 1972 by the Institute for Bible Translation in Stockholm, Sweden. 

George W. Hunter of the China Inland Mission was aware of the Kazan 1901 translation, and after much prayer that he would be able to get a copy of it, a man approached him in the bazaar offering to exchange it (a book he could not read) for one that he could. Hunter revised these translations and transliterated them into Arabic. He also translated Genesis and Acts.

Publication
Acts, Mark, and a tentative edition of Matthew was published by the British and Foreign Bible Society/China Inland Mission in "Tihwafu" (Ürümqi) in 1917. A 2nd edition, (new ed. of the 1917 translation by G. W. Hunter) of Mark was published in Shanghai in 1918. A 2nd edition (new ed. of the 1917 translation by G. W. Hunter) of Acts was published by the British and Foreign Bible Society in Shanghai in 1919. All four Gospels were published again by the British and Foreign Bible Society in Shanghai in 1927, and again in 1928. The Shanghai BFBS also published Genesis in 1931. There may have also been other parts of the Bible translated by G. W. Hunter, but they are lost, as is record of them.

A modern translation of the entire Kazak Bible was published by Yeni Yaşam Yayınları in 2010 in Istanbul.

In 2011, Jehovah's Witnesses published Мәсіхшілердің грек жазбалары. Жаңа дүние аудармасы (New World Translation of the Christian Greek Scriptures) in Kazakh; the complete New World Translation of the Holy Scriptures in Kazakh was released in September 2014.

In 2015 the Kazakh Bible Society published a new translation of the Bible in two variants: a study Bible and a plain text Bible.

References

External links
Xendeⱪ.net
Киелі Кітап

Kazakh language
Kazakh